Glenroy Bros., (no. 2), also known as Comic Boxing: The Glenroy Brothers is an 1894 silent film from Edison Studios. It is about 27 seconds long and shows the Glenroy Brothers boxing.

References

External links
 Film at Library of Congress
 

1894 films
American silent short films
American black-and-white films
Documentary films about boxing
1890s short documentary films
American short documentary films